Farmland preservation is a joint effort by non-governmental organizations and local governments to set aside and protect examples of a region's farmland for the use, education, and enjoyment of future generations. They are operated mostly at state and local levels by government agencies or private entities such as land trusts and are designed to limit conversion of agricultural land to other uses that otherwise might have been more financially attractive to the land owner. Every state provides tax relief through differential (preferential) assessment. Less common approaches include establishing agricultural districts, using zoning to protect agricultural land, purchasing development rights, and transferable development rights. It is often a part of regional planning and national historic preservation.

History
New Jersey passed the Farmland Assessment Act of 1964 to mitigate the loss of farmland to rapid suburban development through the use of favorable tax assessments. But by the late 1970s, the value of farmland had outstripped the tax benefits of the act, so the state purchased deed restrictions on farms through the Agriculture Retention and Development Act of 1981. 

Regional efforts in Monmouth County, New Jersey include the Navesink Highlands Greenway, a project of the Monmouth County Farmland Preservation Program, which, along with the Monmouth Conservation Foundation, purchased the development rights of the Holly Crest Farm in Middletown in September 2008 for US $2.5 million. Over 20 percent of county farmlands and open spaces are permanently preserved.

American Farmland Trust was established in 1980 to preserve farmland and promote sustainable farming practices.

The Genesee Valley Conservancy was founded in New York in 1990.

Management of protected farmland
Conservation easement is one approach used to manage protected farms.

A transferable development rights program offers landowners financial incentives or bonuses for the conservation and maintenance of agricultural land. Land developers can purchase the development rights of certain properties within a designated "sending district" and transfer the rights to another "receiving district" to increase the density of their new development. A widely-noted example of a sending district is the Montgomery County, Maryland Agricultural Reserve.

Partial list of preserved farms
 Elsing Green
 Hampton National Historic Site
 Oatlands Plantation

See also
 Agricultural Land Reserve
 Development-supported agriculture
 Environmental Conservation Acreage Reserve Program
 Preservation development
 Sunderland,_Massachusetts#Housing_and_development

References

Human geography
Land use
Urban planning